The Trustees of Princeton University is a 40-member board responsible for managing Princeton University's endowment, real estate, instructional programs, and admission. The Trustees include at least 13 members elected by alumni classes, and the Governor of New Jersey and the President of the university as ex officio members.

The Trustees' mission and responsibilities stem from the original Charter of the college, written in 1746. The Trustees oversee the budget of the university through the Princeton University Investment Company (PRINCO). Notable recent policy decisions include implementing the residential college system, accepting coeducation, and increasing the size of the undergraduate student body.

Unlike most other governing boards of universities, the Trustees of Princeton University is chartered as a 40-member corporation in its own right that has the authority to establish and govern Princeton University and to grant degrees in the same. This is similar to most of the oldest universities and colleges in the United States (including all of the Ivy League universities except for Cornell University), such as the President and Fellows of Harvard College and the Yale Corporation.

Current Trustees
Officers of the Board
 Christopher L. Eisgruber '83, President of the university
 Louise S. Sams '79, chair of the Board
 Brent L. Henry '69, Vice Chair of the Board
 Peter C. Wendell '72, Clerk of the Board
 Hilary A. Parker ’01, Secretary of the University

Ex officio
 Christopher L. Eisgruber — President of the University
 Phil Murphy — Governor of New Jersey

Members of the Board

See also
 President and Fellows of Harvard College
 Yale Corporation
Trustees of Columbia University in the City of New York
Board of Trustees of Dartmouth College

References

External links
Official website

Princeton University
Princeton University